Kami nAPO Muna is a tribute album to the 1970s Filipino musical group, APO Hiking Society. Released in 2006, the album features covers of APO Hiking Society songs, performed by a number of Filipino bands and artists. It was followed by a second tribute album, Kami nAPO Muna ULIT, in 2007.

Title
The album's title, Kami nAPO Muna, loosely translates to "our turn now" in Filipino; the phrase is also a play on the name Apo. APO Hiking Society itself has used the word nAPO (na pô, the respectful form of "already") in many concerts, as well as on a noontime variety show.

Concert
A tribute concert sponsored by MYX Music Channel was held during the launch of the album, in honour of the trio's contributions to OPM Music. A two-disc limited edition set of Kami nAPO Muna has been released,  with the second disc containing Apo Hiking Society's original versions of the tribute tracks. The album is considered the biggest-selling album of 2006 in the Philippines, with 4× Platinum Certification (i.e., more than 125,000 copies sold) in less than six months. It also garnered Awit Awards' Bestselling Album of the Year for 2007.

Track listing

Notes

References

External links
 Kami nAPO Muna Album Review

APO Hiking Society tribute albums
Compilation albums by Filipino artists
2006 compilation albums
Pop rock compilation albums
Universal Records (Philippines) compilation albums